Ebrahim Hamedi (also Romanized as "Ebrāhim Hāmedi"; born 1949), better known by his stage name Ebi, is an Iranian pop singer who first started his career in Tehran, gaining fame as part of a band, and later as a solo performer. He moved to Los Angeles in 1977, two years before the 1979 revolution in Iran, and continued his career in exile. He also received the title of Mr Voice of the World at the festival. Over 50 years, Ebi has released close to 200 singles, and over 30 albums.

Early life and career

Born in Khorramdareh, he is the eldest of six siblings. Inspired by the Beatles, he formed a beat band known as "the Rebels" with  Shahram Shabpareh and Siavash Ghomayshi in the mid 60's. He was also a part of the "Sunboys" and "Black cats" bands, before embarking on a career as a solo singer.

He left Iran to go on tour in the United States in 1977 prior to the Islamic Revolution of 1979.

Among other "politically charged" songs, "Hala" (Hey), written by the Iranian poet Mina Assadi and produced by Esfandiar Monfaredzadeh, Ebi in the year of 1999 sang about the brutality of the Iranian regime and the possibility for the Iranian people to rise again. He has called this song his most important political song in an interview in 2013 with the TV channel Manoto. In 2009 Ebi again commented on the domestic politics of Iran by singing the song "Tasmim" (Decision) as a response to the 2009 presidential election.

In 2020, Ebi appeared on Persia's Got Talent.

Personal life 
He divides his time between Marbella, Spain and Los Angeles with his second wife. In the early 2000s, he lived in Sweden. Ebi has a stepson from his current wife.

Awards
1974: 1st singer in Turkey festival with the song Shekar.

Discography

Albums
 "Tapesh" (1974)
 "Nazi Naz Kon" (1976)
 "Shab Zadeh" (1987)
 "Kouhe Yakh" (1987)
 "Khalij" (1990)
 "Gharibeh" (1990)
 "Noon O Panir O Sabzi" (with Dariush) (1990)
 "Setareh Donbaleh Dar" (1993)
 "Moalleme Bad" (1992)
 "Atal Matal" (1994)
 "Setarehaye Sorbi" (1995)
 "Atre To" (1996)
 "Ba To" (1996)
 "Taje Taraneh" (1997)
 "Pir" (1999)
 "Tolou Kon" (1999)
 "Shabe Niloufari" (2003)
 "Hasrate Parvaz" (2006)
 "Remembrance of Kamran & Hooman and Ebi" (With Kamran & Hooman) (2009)
 "Hesse Tanhaee" (2011)
 "Jane Javani" (2014)
 "Lalehzaar" (2019)

Singles
 "Hamkhoon", ft. Shahrokh (1981)
"Khali" "New Version" (2008)
 "Royaye Ma" ft. Shadmehr Aghili (2012)
 "Hamin Khoobe" ft. Shadmehr Aghili (2013)
 "Negaranet Misham" (2013)
 "Ye Dokhtar" ft. Shadmehr Aghili (2013)
 "I Can Hear Christmas" – with Liel Kolet (2013) 
 "Nostalgia" (With Googoosh) (2014)
 "Ki Ashkato Pak Mikoneh" (With Googoosh) (2014)
 "Delpoosh" (2016)
 "Assal" (2016)
 "Nafas Nafas" "Remix" (2017)
 "Kash" (Unofficial) (With Tohi) (2018)
 "Zakhme Namaree" (2020)
 "Horme To" (2021)
 "Tehrane Man" (2022)
 "Ghafase Doa O Dar" (2023)

See also
 Fereydoun Farrokhzad
 Arash
 Mina Assadi

References

External links

Ebi's official website
[ Ebi] at AllMusic
Sheet Music of Ebi Songs
Ebi’s profile on vowave

1949 births
Iranian pop singers
Living people
Iranian musicians
Singers from Tehran
Iranian male singers
Iranian singer-songwriters
Iranian emigrants to Spain
Iranian emigrants to Sweden
Musicians from Tehran
Caltex Records artists
Taraneh Records artists
Persian-language singers
20th-century Iranian male singers
American people of Iranian descent
Exiles of the Iranian Revolution in the United States